Te Lo Dije is the first Spanish-language extended play by American recording artist Miguel, released on April 5, 2019, via ByStorm Entertainment and RCA Records. 
It is a reissue of Miguel's fourth album, War & Leisure, featuring five tracks from the album recorded primary in Spanish. The EP features guest appearances from C. Tangana, Flor de Toloache and Kali Uchis.

Background
Months after the release of his fourth album, War & Leisure, Miguel announced that he was planning on recording a Spanish project. On April 5, 2019, the project was released as an EP instead.

Track listing

Charts

References

2019 EPs
Spanish-language EPs
RCA Records EPs
EPs by American artists